Professional wrestling in Israel has been promoted in the country since the 1950s after the nation's establishment.

History
In the 1950s, Rafael Halperin worked in the United States as a professional wrestler in Vince McMahon Sr.'s Capitol Wrestling Corporation. He later returned to Israel, where he popularized professional wrestling. His most well known matches in Israel were against Achmad Fuad and the "Jordanian Tiger" Abu Antar. The match with Fuad took place on 18 June 1966 in front of 6,000 fans at the Bloomfield Stadium and caused the police to use tear gas after a big riot broke out immediately after Fuad attacked the victorious Halperin. The match with Abu Antar took place on 20 September 1973 and was the most successful local wrestling match seen in the country, as the Yad Eliyahu Arena was sold out to witness Halperin defeat the "Jordanian Tiger". This was Halperin's last match and after he retired from professional wrestling.

Kevin Von Erich and his brother Mike Von Erich later came to Israel in the early 1980s. The Von Erich family were wrestling for World Class Championship Wrestling which was carried in Israel on Middle East Television, on Saturday nights. During this time, WCCW was the most popular English-language program in Israel. The Von Erich family trip to Israel was considered very successful and credited them for bringing popularity of professional wrestling to Israel. During the tour, WCCW created a WCCW Middle Eastern Championship which Mike Von Erich won defeating Gino Hernandez on August 7, 1985. Among the main participants on the Israel tour included Chris Adams, Iceman King Parsons, Buddy Roberts, Scott Casey, Brian Adias, Rip Oliver, Kelly Kiniski and Johnny Mantell.

The UWF Israeli Championship was a secondary title in the Universal Wrestling Federation. It was awarded to Joshua Ben-Gurion in May 1991 and retired in November 1991.

In response to the 2014 Jerusalem synagogue attack, World Championship Wrestling veteran, Bill Goldberg, put on Tefillin to raise awareness of the incident.

Noam Dar, was born in Tel Aviv, and raised in Ayr. Dar was a contestant on Season 2 of Total Nonstop Action Wrestling's British Boot Camp which was televised nationally in the UK on Challenge TV. Dar advanced to the final six but the competition but ultimately did not win. On 31 March 2016, Dar was announced as a participant in WWE's upcoming Global Cruiserweight Series tournament, making him the first Israeli wrestler to perform in the WWE. Dar currently wrestling on the 205 Live and NXT UK brands.

In July 2017 the Drive in Arena in Tel Aviv hosted the largest wrestling show in Israel in over 20 years, known as the Rage Megashow. The show featured the return of Kevin Von Erich (with his sons Ross and Marshall) Tatanka and Marty Jannetty to Israel. Other international stars included Bad Bones, David Starr, and Jurn Simmons.

On 7 August 2017, Israeli Tomer Shalom made his WWE debut in a match against Jason Jordan.

Despite the boycott imposed by the Arab and Muslim-majority states, Israelis sometimes compete with Arab or Muslim wrestlers (particularly Noam Dar competing against Mustafa Ali).

Professional wrestling promotions
Israeli Pro Wrestling Association (IPWA) was an independent wrestling promotion, the first such promotion operating in Israel. IPWA was founded on 17 October 2001 by Gery Roif and ran a few exhibition matches on national TV before holding the initial Summer Splash event in summer 2002. In 2005 almost the entire IPWA roster starred in a wrestling/social satire sitcom series "Makkat Medina" ("The Land Under Attack"), gaining further recognition in Israel. Both Kevin Von Erich and Bret Hart visited the crew during taping. On 16 August 2012 Tatanka main evented the Wrestling Super Show as he defeated Rabbi Swissa to win the IPWA Heavyweight Championship. Two months later the match was shown on Israeli sport channel ONE. On 19 April 2014 former two time WWE Cruiserweight champion and two time ECW Tag Team champion, Little Guido defeated Rabbi Swissa in IPWA's traditional Passover Bash which was the last show of the promotion. In April 2019 however, IPWA returned with an additional Passover Bash event, which is scheduled to feature Jay Lethal defending the ROH World Championship against David Starr. The card is also scheduled to include a championship match between Roif and Matt Sydal.

All Wrestling Organization (AWO) was founded in early June 2012 by Mahran Abdul Hai, as Israel's second promotion. The debut show, "WrestleFest", was held on 21 June in front of a sold-out crowd of 600 fans. The show was sponsored and broadcast by Panet. On 21 November 2013 Joe E. Legend main evented the "Autumn Fallout" show which took place in Tel Aviv. On 29 May 2014 the promotion ran the first local professional wrestling show in Haifa, the show was taped and was broadcast on the Ego Total channel. "WrestleFest III" took place on 26 June 2014 and saw the debut of former WWE superstars Carlito and Chris Masters (who won the AWO championship), this show was also broadcast on Ego Total as well as the main Ego channel. AWO currently has two championships, the AWO Heavyweight Championship and the AWO Israeli Championship.

Israeli Wrestling League (IWL), the third wrestling federation in Israel was founded in 2013 by Eitan Levy and Lidor Bushari. The first performance of the league took place in May 2013 during the filming of the wrestling season in the fourth season of HaYafa VeHaChnun, the Israeli version of Beauty and the Geek. The wrestling academy, led by Lidor Bushari, opened in May 2014 in Rehovot at the Alternative Sports Center, where performances were held every two month. As of 2017, the academy operates in Petah Tikva, where its shows are being held as well. The IWL has one belt, the IWL Heavyweight Championship.

Ultimate Wrestling Israel (UWI), the fourth wrestling federation in Israel was founded in November 2015. The UWI currently has one belt, the UWI Shomer Shabbos Heavyweight Championship, previously known as the UWI Heavyweight Championship until February 2017.

American wrestling promotions and Israel

WWE

WWE on TV
In the early 1990s the WWF (now WWE) was broadcast on Friday afternoons in Israel on Sport 5. As publicity for the program the WWF gave out free photo albums to high school kids. In 1995 Dafna Lemish began a successful campaign to remove WWE content from TV, claiming a direct correlation between wrestling and violence in schools. Eventually WWE programming was brought back to Israel, with Raw and SmackDown broadcasting on Sport 1 and Sport 1 HD.

Live shows
The WWE made several live appearances in Israel in 1994. In July 2006 the WWE scheduled live events in Tel Aviv for their SmackDown brand, however due to the 2006 Lebanon War the WWE postponed the events to September, before eventually canceling the show, after having sold 22,000 tickets.

IC = Entered match as Intercontinental Champion
TT = Entered match as Tag Team Champion
HW = Entered match as Heavyweight Champion

Impact Wrestling
In September 2007 Total Nonstop Action Wrestling (now Impact Wrestling) announced two shows to take place in Tel Aviv in November, in the Nokia Arena. Wrestlers promoted to attend included TNA World Heavyweight Champion Kurt Angle, Samoa Joe, Christian Cage, Abyss, AJ Styles, X Division Champion Jay Lethal, Team 3D, Triple X, Sonjay Dutt, James Storm, Gail Kim, Jackie Moore, Chris Harris, Eric Young, Robert Roode, Voodoo Kin Mafia, and Petey Williams. The tour was ultimately canceled stating business reasons.

Both the Impact! TV series and pay-per-views are carried on EGO Total in Israel.

Major League Wrestling
In January 2019 Major League Wrestling announced EGO Total as their first international TV partner.

Ring of Honor
In February 2019, it was announced that in April Ring of Honor scheduled Jay Lethal to defend the ROH World Championship against David Starr at IPWA's Passover Bash. Should Lethal lose the championship prior to the match, Starr would instead face whoever the new champion is at the time. In March, Starr released a video on his feelings on the match, which Ring of Honor ordered to have taken down. In early April however, Lethal lost the championship at G1 Supercard, however the new champion did not appear, and Lethal appeared as a non-champion. Starr proceeded to call out Ring of Honor again, for failing to deliver on their promises.

See also
Sports in Israel
Boycotts of Israel in sports

References